Galeola is a genus of orchids (family Orchidaceae) belonging to the subfamily Vanilloideae.

All species in this genus are myco-heterotrophic, i.e. they are parasitic upon fungi. The genus is spread throughout southeast Asia (from India to China to New Guinea) as well as Madagascar and Comoros.

Galeola is of biological interest because of its exclusive myco-heterotrophic nature and its seeds. The seeds are the biggest orchid seeds in the world. They are winged, which is also extraordinary for an orchid.

Species 
At present, there are 6 currently recognized species:

Galeola cathcarthii Hook.f. (Thailand, Myanmar, India, Assam, Bhutan, Sikkim)
Galeola faberi Rolfe (China, Assam, Nepal, Vietnam, Sumatra)
Galeola falconeri Hook.f. (India, Taiwan, Assam, Bhutan, Nepal, Thailand, Vietnam, China)
Galeola humblotii H.G.Reichb. (Madagascar, Comoros)
Galeola lindleyana (Hook.f. & J.W.Thomson) H.G.Reichb. ( Bhutan, China, India, Sumatra, Vietnam, Assam, Nepal, Taiwan)
Galeola nudifolia Lour. (1790) (China, India, Indonesia, Malaysia, Philippines, Thailand, Vietnam, Assam, Laos, Cambodia, Burma, New Guinea)

References

External links 
 
 

Vanilloideae genera
Vanilleae
Myco-heterotrophic orchids